Ro-45 was an Imperial Japanese Navy Kaichū type submarine of the K6 sub-class. Completed and commissioned in January 1944, she served in the central Pacific Ocean during World War II and was sunk in April 1944 during her first combat sortie.

Design and description
The submarines of the K6 sub-class were versions of the preceding K5 sub-class with greater range and diving depth. They displaced  surfaced and  submerged.

For surface running, the boats were powered by two  diesel engines, each driving one propeller shaft. When submerged each propeller was driven by a  electric motor. They could reach  on the surface and  underwater.

The boats were armed with four internal bow  torpedo tubes and carried a total of ten torpedoes. They were also armed with a single 40-caliber  anti-aircraft (AA) gun and two single  AA guns.

Construction and commissioning

Ro-45 was laid down as Submarine No. 386 on 20 October 1942 by Mitsubishi at Kobe, Japan. She was launched on 21 July 1943 and was renamed Ro-45 on that day. She was completed and commissioned on 11 January 1944.

Service history

Upon commissioning, Ro-45 was attached to the Maizuru Naval District and assigned to Submarine Squadron 11 for workups. On 14 April 1944, she was reassigned to Submarine Division 34 in the 6th Fleet. She departed Kure, Japan, on 16 April 1944 bound for Truk, which she reached on 27 April 1944.

While Ro-45 was at Truk, the aircraft carriers of United States Navy Task Force 58 began two days of airstrikes against Truk on 29 April 1944.

Loss
The contact disappeared from radar, indicating a submerging submarine. MacDonough subsequently gained sonar contact on the submarine and, with an F6F Hellcat fighter from Fighter Squadron 28 (VF-28) aboard the light aircraft carrier  providing spotting support, made two depth-charge attacks. The destroyer  also joined the attack. Oil and debris later rose to the surface.

No other Japanese submarine made contact with Task Force 58, and the submarine MacDonough and Stephen Potter sank probably was Ro-45. On 20 May 1944, the Imperial Japanese Navy declared her to be presumed lost off Truk with all 74 men on board. She was stricken from the Navy list on 10 July 1944.

Some sources suggest that Ro-45 was sunk off Saipan in the Mariana Islands by the U.S. submarine  on 20 April 1944, but that is incorrect because Ro-45 remained active after that date.

Notes

References
 

 

Ro-35-class submarines
Kaichū type submarines
Ships built by Mitsubishi Heavy Industries
1944 ships
World War II submarines of Japan
Japanese submarines lost during World War II
World War II shipwrecks in the Pacific Ocean
Maritime incidents in April 1944
Submarines sunk by United States warships
Ships lost with all hands